Kundziņsala is an island and neighbourhood in Daugava River in Riga, the capital of Latvia. The neighbourhood is administratively part of Riga's Northern District. Kundziņsala is the largest island in Riga. It is mainly covered by an industrial area related to maritime trade. However, there are 468 permanent residences.

The name Kundziņsala means "Nobleman's Island" in Latvian.

The sole public transportation route to the island is the Rīgas Satiksme's #3 trolleybus (previously #33 bus). There are two bridges connecting Kundziņsala with the Sarkandaugava neighborhood on the mainland.

External links
  

Neighbourhoods in Riga
Islands in Riga